The Heinkel HD 40 was a special-purpose cargo aircraft developed in Germany in the 1920s to distribute the Berlin newspaper B.Z.. The success of Heinkel's previous design for the publisher, the HD 39, led to the order of a similar aircraft with greater capacity, and Heinkel responded with a machine of similar layout, but considerably enlarged. Like the HD 39, it was a conventional single-bay biplane with staggered wings of unequal span, and a fuselage that nearly filled the interplane gap. The pilot sat in an open cockpit, and the undercarriage was of fixed, tailskid type with divided main units. The wings were of wooden construction, while the fuselage was built from welded steel tube skinned in plywood.

In addition to its newspaper-carrying cargo bay, the HD 40 was fitted with another compartment that could be quickly transformed between carrying extra cargo and carrying up to eight reporters or passengers. After only six months' service, the aircraft was destroyed in a crash following the failure of its engine.

Specifications

References

 
 
 

1920s German cargo aircraft
HD 40
Biplanes
Aircraft first flown in 1927